The term double-fault can be an adjective referring to:

 double fault (computing), a fault that occurs during processing of another
 double fault (tennis), two consecutive faults during service